Baron Muncy was a title in the Peerage of England. It was created on 6 February 1299 when Walter de Muncy was summoned to parliament. At his death about ten years later, the barony became extinct.

Baron Muncy (1299)
Walter de Muncy, 1st Baron Muncy (d. c. 1309)

References

1299 establishments in England
Extinct baronies in the Peerage of England
Noble titles created in 1299